Nastja Čeh (born 26 January 1978) is a Slovenian former professional footballer who played as a midfielder.

Club career
Čeh started his career with his hometown club Drava Ptuj. By the age of 17 he was playing in the first team in the 2. SNL. In the 1996–97 season he moved from Drava to Maribor, later spending one season at Olimpija before returning to Maribor.

Čeh then moved on to Club Brugge. His first season at the club brought success in the Belgian Cup, and the following season he helped the club win their 12th league title. In August 2002 he scored a late equalising goal in the second-leg of Brugge's Champions League third round qualifying tie against Shakhtar Donetsk. Brugge then went on to qualify through a penalty shoot-out.

In 2005 Čeh was sold to Austria Wien. Jupiler League team Charleroi tried to buy Čeh in late August 2006 but in 2007 he instead signed for Russian Premier Liga side FC Khimki, where he was given the number 10 shirt.

On 5 January 2009, he left Khimki and moved to Greek club Panserraikos. After a short spell in Greece, he signed for Rijeka, spending a season there before moving on yet again to play in Israel.

In April 2012 Čeh signed for PSMS Medan (ISL) of the Indonesia Super League. His debut match was on 9 April, where he came on in the 53rd minute replacing Muhammad Antoni; he also received his first yellow card on that match.

International career
Čeh was capped 46 times for Slovenia and scored six goals. He made two appearances for the national team during the 2002 FIFA World Cup, both times coming on as a substitute.

Controversies
In April 2011, it was revealed by the Slovenian media that Maribor police department was, for the past six months, investigating an illegal betting organization and six individuals, four of which were from the Maribor area and had already been taken into custody. The Police also revealed that two other collaborators were still at large and that one of those was Goran Šukalo. Šukalo categorically denied his involvement in the matter and revealed that another football player, Nastja Čeh, was still owing him €73,000 and was avoiding payment. Allegedly this was the reason why Čeh pawned his property near Ptuj to Kosta Turner, which was visible from the official real estate papers. In January 2012, the general prosecutor on the District Court in Maribor proposed an indictment of six individuals, ring leaders of the illegal betting organization, in light of new evidence against them. The organization allegedly accepted a total of €43 million of bets, with €2.53 million being placed by Čeh.

Career statistics
Scores and results list Slovenia's goal tally first, score column indicates score after each Čeh goal.

Honours
Maribor
Prva liga: 1999–2000, 2000–01

Club Brugge
Jupiler League: 2002–03, 2004–05
Belgian Cup: 2001–02, 2002–03, 2003–04
Belgian Supercup: 2002, 2003, 2004, 2005

Austria Wien
Bundesliga: 2005–06
Austrian Cup: 2005–06

See also
Slovenian international players
NK Maribor players

References

External links
Player profile at PrvaLiga 
National team stats at NZS 

1978 births
Living people
People from Ptuj
Slovenian footballers
Association football midfielders
Slovenia international footballers
Slovenia youth international footballers
Slovenia under-21 international footballers
2002 FIFA World Cup players
Slovenian PrvaLiga players
Slovenian Second League players
Belgian Pro League players
Austrian Football Bundesliga players
Russian Premier League players
Croatian Football League players
Israeli Premier League players
Liga 1 (Indonesia) players
V.League 1 players
NK Drava Ptuj players
NK Maribor players
NK Olimpija Ljubljana (1945–2005) players
Club Brugge KV players
FK Austria Wien players
FC Khimki players
Panserraikos F.C. players
HNK Rijeka players
Bnei Sakhnin F.C. players
Maccabi Petah Tikva F.C. players
PSMS Medan players
Thanh Hóa FC players
NK Drava Ptuj (2004) players
Slovenian expatriate footballers
Expatriate footballers in Croatia
Slovenian expatriate sportspeople in Croatia
Expatriate footballers in Russia
Slovenian expatriate sportspeople in Russia
Expatriate footballers in Israel
Slovenian expatriate sportspeople in Israel
Expatriate footballers in Belgium
Slovenian expatriate sportspeople in Belgium
Expatriate footballers in Austria
Slovenian expatriate sportspeople in Austria
Expatriate footballers in Indonesia
Slovenian expatriate sportspeople in Indonesia
Expatriate footballers in Vietnam